Glenmore, Virginia may refer to:
Glenmore, Albemarle County, Virginia
Glenmore, Buckingham County, Virginia